Naeema Garaj is a Pakistani actress. She is known for her roles in dramas Yeh Zindagi Hai, Agar Tum Na Hotay, Mohabbat Jaye Bhar Mein, New York Se New Karachi and Kab Mere Kehlaoge.

Early life
Faiza was born on 1 January 1968 in Karachi, Pakistan. She started acting in theater along with her father Garaj Babu.

Career
Naeema started to appear in dramas on PTV. She was noted for her roles in dramas Agar Tum Na Hotay, Mohabbat Jaye Bhar Mein, Kab Mere Kehlaoge and Noorpur Ki Rani. She also appeared in the drama Yeh Zindagi Hai and Yeh Zindagi Hai Season 2 as Shakira which was the longest-running television series. She also appeared in movie Maalik as Asma. Since then she appeared in dramas Phupho Amma, Upar Gori Ka Makaan, Bhai Bhai, Yehi Hai Zindagi, 3 Khawa 3, Ghar Damad and Rishta Anjana Sa.

Personal life
Naeema is married and has children, Naeema father was a theater and film actor. Naeema's father Garaj Babu died in 2018.

Filmography

Television

Telefilm

Film

References

External links
 
 

1968 births
Living people
20th-century Pakistani actresses
Pakistani television actresses
21st-century Pakistani actresses
Pakistani film actresses